This list contains mottos of Norwegian institutions. Norway does not have a state motto; however, the personal motto of the reigning monarch can be said to fill some of that function. The motto of the three last monarchs has been Alt for Norge which translates roughly as All for Norway. The motto was first chosen by King Haakon VII and immortalised as the rallying motto of the Norwegian resistance against the German occupation of Norway. It is not common for Norwegian municipalities or government agencies to have mottos.

Monarch

Each reigning monarch chooses his personal motto; however, the last three kings have all chosen "Alt for Norge".

Government institutions

Military

Municipalities

References

Norwegian culture
Norway